Frank McClelland is a chef and restaurateur in the Boston area who received a James Beard Foundation Award   in 2007 for Best Northeast Chef.

Culinary career
In 1988, McClelland bought L'Espalier, a fine dining French restaurant in the Back Bay, from Moncef Meddeb (chef) before closing it in 2018. His second restaurant was Sel de la Terre on State Street. In 2016 he opened the Essex, Massachusetts restaurant  Riverbend.

While at L’Espalier, he was the founder and CEO of New France which was a holding company for his restaurants.

Along with Daniel Bojorquez with whom he had worked at L’Espalier and Sel de la Terre, he opened La Brasa in Somerville.

The eponymous Frank opened in 2019 in Beverly, Massachusetts.

Awards and Honors
He is the only one in Boston to have earned seventeen consecutive Five Diamond Awards from AAA while at L’Espalier. In 1986, Food & Wine named him of the top 25 new chefs in the US to watch.

Personal life
He grew up in New Hampshire on his grandparents’ farm and has lived in Essex, Massachusetts for more than forty years.

References

American male chefs
Chefs from Massachusetts
American restaurateurs
James Beard Foundation Award winners
People from Essex, Massachusetts
American chief executives of food industry companies
Chefs from New Hampshire